Gauley Bridge Railroad Station is a historic railroad station in Gauley Bridge, West Virginia. The station was constructed on a Kanawha and Michigan Railroad line in 1893 and later became a Chesapeake and Ohio Railroad station. It closed to trains in 1958 and became a fire station for the Gauley Bridge Volunteer Fire Department until it closed permanently in 1973. The station is reflective of company-built small-town railroad stations of its era. It was added to the National Register of Historic Places on May 15, 1980.

References

Buildings and structures in Fayette County, West Virginia
Railway stations on the National Register of Historic Places in West Virginia
Railway stations in the United States opened in 1893
Railway stations closed in 1958
Stations along Chesapeake and Ohio Railway lines
National Register of Historic Places in Fayette County, West Virginia
Former railway stations in West Virginia